The demographics of Sudan include the Sudanese people and their characteristics, Sudan, including population density, ethnicity, education level, health, economic status, religious affiliations, and other aspects of the population.

In Sudan's 1993 census, the population was calculated at 30 million. No comprehensive census has been carried out since that time due to the Second Sudanese Civil War. Estimates of Sudan, including the population of South Sudan, ranged from 37 million (United Nations) to 45 million (CIA). Since the secession  of South Sudan in July 2011, the current population of Sudan is estimated to be  about  million. The population of metropolitan Khartoum (including Khartoum, Omdurman, and Khartoum North) is growing rapidly and ranges from six to seven million, including around two million displaced persons from the southern war zone, as well as western and eastern drought-affected areas.

Population overview
The majority of the population in Sudan are the indigenous Nubian inhabitants of the Nile Valley.  Due to the process of Arabisation common throughout the rest of the Arab world, today Arab culture predominates in Sudan. The majority of ethnic groups of Sudan fall under Arabs, and the minority being Other African ethnic groups such as the Beja, Fur, Nuba, and Fallata. When counted as one people Sudanese Arabs are by far the largest ethnic group in Sudan, however African ethnic groups are a large minority if counted as one group. They are almost entirely Muslim; while the majority speak Sudanese Arabic; some other Arab tribes speak different Arabic dialects like Awadia and Fadnia and Bani Arak tribes who speak Najdi Arabic; Bani Hassan, Al-Ashraf, Kinanah and Rashaida who speak Hejazi Arabic. In addition, Arab tribes like the Baggara and other Darfurians, both who speak Chadian Arabic. Sudanese Arabs of northern and eastern parts descend primarily from migrants from the Arabian Peninsula and some of the pre-existing indigenous populations of Sudan, most predominantly the Nubian people who also share a common history with Egypt. Additionally, a few pre-Islamic Arabian tribes existed in Sudan from earlier migrations into the region from Western Arabia, although most Arabs in Sudan are dated from migrations after the 12th century. The vast majority of Arab tribes in Sudan migrated into the Sudan in the 12th century, intermarried with the indigenous African populations and introduced Islam.

Population statistics

Achieving good counts of the population is difficult in Sudan, because conducting a census has been difficult due to various conflicts and wars in the southern, eastern and western regions of Sudan over the past few decades. The government of South Sudan (led by the former SPLM resistance movement) has in the past accused Sudan of deliberately manipulating the census in oil-rich regions such as the Abyei district, on the border between Sudan and South Sudan. The population count is a determining factor for the share of wealth and power each part of Sudan receives after the secession of South Sudan (See: Naivasha Agreement). Another complication is the Southern Sudanese refugees present in the north, whose citizenship in Sudan after the secession of South Sudan is now in question. 250,000 refugees from Syria live in Sudan.

Population Estimates by Sex and Age Group (01.VII.2016):

Population Estimates by Sex and Age Group (01.VII.2020):

Vital statistics

The vital statistics below do not include South Sudan.

`

Ethnic groups

Sudanese Arabs (approximately 70%) Ethnically Arabised Africans  
Fur people 
Beja people
Nuba people
Nubian people

Languages

The most widely spoken languages in Sudan are:
Arabic language:
Sudanese Arabic.
Najdi and Hejazi Arabic, (mainly in mid-north and mid-east regions).
Chadian Arabic in western region, (mainly spoken by Baggara and various Arabized African tribes).
Nubian language in far north, (mainly spoken by Nubians of Mahas, Dongola and Halfa).
Beja language knows as Bedawit in far east alongside Red sea, (mainly spoken by Beja of Hadandawa, Ababda and Bisharin).

Before 2005, only Arabic was the official language. In the 2005 constitution, Sudan's official languages became Arabic and English:

The working constitution of the post-2019 Revolution transitional period specifies no national language.

Religion

In Sudan, 97% of the population adheres to Islam, with the overwhelming majority being adherents of the Sunni Sufi branch and the Maliki school of Islamic jurisprudence. The remainder of the population follows either animist and indigenous beliefs or Christianity, especially in Khartoum and in southern regions of the country bordering South Sudan.

Christians in Sudan which are refugees or immigrants from the south belong to various churches including the Roman Catholic Church, small Melkite and Maronite communities in the north, as well as Anglicans followers in the Episcopal Church of Sudan and the recently formed Reformed Episcopal Church. There are significant but long-established groups of Coptic Orthodox and Greek Orthodox Christians in Khartoum and other northern cities.

There are also Ethiopian and Eritrean Orthodox communities in Khartoum and eastern Sudan, largely made up of refugees and migrants from the past few decades. Other Christian groups with smaller followings in the country include the Africa Inland Church, the Armenian Apostolic Church, the Sudan Church of Christ, the Sudan Interior Church, Jehovah's Witnesses, the Sudan Pentecostal Church, the Sudan Evangelical Presbyterian Church (in the North).

Religious identity plays a role in the country's political divisions. Northern and western Muslims have dominated the country's political and economic system since independence. The NCP draws much of its support from Islamists, Salafis/Wahhabis and other conservative Arab Muslims in the north. The Umma Party has traditionally attracted Arab followers of the Ansar sect of Sufism as well as non-Arab Muslims from Darfur and Kordofan.

The Democratic Unionist Party (DUP) includes both Arab and non-Arab Muslims in the north and east, especially those in the Khatmia Sufi sect.

Other demographic statistics
Demographic statistics according to the World Population Review in 2022.

One birth every 22 seconds	
One death every 2 minutes	
One net migrant every 29 minutes	
Net gain of one person every 29 seconds

The following demographic are from the CIA World Factbook unless otherwise indicated.

Population
47,958,856 (2022 est.)
43,120,843 (July 2018 est.)
35,482,233 (July 2014 est.)

Religions
Sunni Muslim, small Christian minority

Age structure
0-14 years: 42.01% (male 9,726,937/female 9,414,988)
15-24 years: 20.94% (male 4,852,903/female 4,687,664)
25-54 years: 29.89% (male 6,633,567/female 6,986,241)
55-64 years: 4.13% (male 956,633/female 923,688)
65 years and over: 3.03% (2020 est.) (male 729,214/female 649,721)

Birth rate
33.47 births/1,000 population (2022 est.) Country comparison to the world: 20th
34.2 births/1,000 population (2018 est.) Country comparison to the world: 23rd

Death rate
6.3 deaths/1,000 population (2022 est.) Country comparison to the world: 146th
6.7 deaths/1,000 population (2018 est.) Country comparison to the world: 139th

Total fertility rate
4.6 children born/woman (2022 est.) Country comparison to the world: 17th
4.85 children born/woman (2018 est.) Country comparison to the world: 17th

Population growth rate
2.55% (2022 est.) Country comparison to the world: 19th
2.93% (2018 est.) Country comparison to the world: 9th

Median age
total: 18.3 years. Country comparison to the world: 211st
male: 18.1 years
female: 18.5 years (2020 est.)

total: 17.9 years. Country comparison to the world: 214th
male: 17.7 years 
female: 18.1 years (2018 est.)

Contraceptive prevalence rate
12.2% (2014)

Net migration rate
-1.67 migrant(s)/1,000 population (2022 est.) Country comparison to the world: 163rd
1.9 migrant(s)/1,000 population (2018 est.) Country comparison to the world: 52nd

Dependency ratios
total dependency ratio: 81.6 (2015 est.)
youth dependency ratio: 75.4 (2015 est.)
elderly dependency ratio: 6.3 (2015 est.)
potential support ratio: 15.9 (2015 est.)

Urbanization
urban population: 36% of total population (2022)
rate of urbanization: 3.43% annual rate of change (2020-25 est.)

urban population: 34.6% of total population (2018)
rate of urbanization: 3.17% annual rate of change (2015-20 est.)0

Life expectancy at birth
total population: 67.12 years. Country comparison to the world: 193rd
male: 64.89 years
female: 69.46 years (2022 est.)

total population: 65.8 years 
male: 63.7 years 
female: 68.1 years (2018 est.)

total population: 63.32 years
male: 61.27 years
female: 65.46 years (2014 est.)

Major infectious diseases
degree of risk: very high (2020)
food or waterborne diseases: bacterial and protozoal diarrhea, hepatitis A and E, and typhoid fever
vectorborne diseases: malaria, dengue fever, and Rift Valley fever
water contact diseases: schistosomiasis
animal contact diseases: rabies
respiratory diseases: meningococcal meningitis

Nationality
noun:
Sudanese (singular and plural)
adjective:
Sudanese

Sex ratio
at birth:
1.05 male(s)/female
0–14 years: 
1.03 male(s)/female
15–24 years: 
1.06 male(s)/female
25–54 years: 
0.94 male(s)/female
55–64 years: 
1.1 male(s)/female
65 years and over: 
1.19 male(s)/female
total population: 
1.18 male(s)/female (2014 est.)

Literacy
definition: age 15 and over can read and write (2015 est.)
total population: 60.7%
male: 65.4%
female: 56.1% (2018)

total population: 75.9% 
male: 83.3% 
female: 68.6% (2015 est.)

total population: 71.9%
male: 80.7%
female: 63.2%
note: pre-secession of South Sudan (2011 est.)

School life expectancy (primary to tertiary education)
total: 8 years 
male: 8 years 
female: 7 years (2015)

Unemployment, youth ages 15-24
total: 32.6%
male: 27.4%
female: 43.5% (2011 est.)

References